"You Better Move On" is a 1961 rhythm and blues song by Arthur Alexander. It reached number 24 on the Billboard Hot 100 in March 1962. Versions by Billy "Crash" Craddock, George Jones and Johnny Paycheck were hits on the Country charts.

Arthur Alexander version
The lyrics were inspired by Alexander's real life situation, in which his girlfriend and future wife already had a boyfriend.  Alexander said of the situation "When I met her out of high school he was still hanging in there. His family was pretty well off.  I didn't have no money but I knew she liked me.  It was a small town and people would be talking.  That's where I got the idea for the song.  I didn't talk to him personally.  I said it in song."

The song was recorded at the fledgling FAME Studios, which at that point was located above the City Drug Store in Florence, Alabama. (The studio would shortly move to its more famous location in nearby Muscle Shoals, Alabama.) The session musicians on the recording included David Briggs, piano, Terry Thompson, guitar, Forest Riley, acoustic guitar, Norbert Putnam, bass guitar, Jerry Carrigan, drums, and unknown back up singers.

Music critic Toby Creswell included "You Better Move On" as one of the 1001 great songs of all time.

The Rolling Stones version
The Rolling Stones released their version of Arthur Alexander's song on an EP, The Rolling Stones, on January 10, 1964. Bruce Eder of AllMusic wrote about the EP: "the real centrepiece was Arthur Alexander's 'You Better Move On,' an American-spawned favourite that the band had been doing in concert — this was their chance to show a softer, more lyrical and soulful sound that was every bit as intense as the blues and hard R&B they'd already done on record." The EP reached no. 1 in the UK EP charts in February 1964, having entered the chart the week after its release.

Billy "Crash" Craddock version
Billy "Crash" Craddock released a version of the song as a single in 1971 and on his album of the same name the following year. Craddock's version reached No. 10 on Billboards Hot Country Singles chart, No. 4 on Cash Boxs Country Top 65 chart, and No. 9 on Record Worlds Country Singles Chart.

Tommy Roe version
Tommy Roe released a version in 1979, which reached No. 70 on Billboards Hot Country Singles chart, No. 68 on the Cash Box Top 100 Country chart, and No. 75 on Record Worlds Country Singles chart.

George Jones and Johnny Paycheck version
George Jones and Johnny Paycheck recorded a version for their 1980 collaboration album Double Trouble. It was also released as a single and reached No. 18 on Billboards Hot Country Singles chart, No. 19 on Record Worlds Country Singles chart, and No. 23 on the Cash Box Top 100 Country chart.

References

1961 songs
1961 singles
1980 singles
Dot Records singles
Billy "Crash" Craddock songs
George Jones songs
Johnny Paycheck songs
Songs written by Arthur Alexander
Epic Records singles
Arthur Alexander songs
Tommy Roe songs